Dudu Topaz (September 20, 1946 – August 20, 2009) (born David Goldenberg) was an Israeli TV personality, comedian, actor, screenwriter, playwright, author and radio and television host. In August 2009 he committed suicide while incarcerated, having been criminally charged with conspiring violence against prominent media figures in Israel.

Biography 
David Goldenberg, later Dudu Topaz, was born in Haifa, in then British Mandate of Palestine (now Israel) to Lilly and Eliyahu Goldenberg. His father was a radio announcer, actor and director. After his army service, Topaz studied acting in London. Upon his return, he performed with the Haifa Theatre and appeared in entertainment shows around the country. Topaz was married two times and had three sons.

Entertainment career 

In the 1970s, he took part in an Israeli radio show called "לצון נופל על לצון" (loosely:"A prankster falls for a prank"). His first job in television was as an English teacher in the Israeli Educational Television. In the early eighties Topaz began to direct television game shows in Channel 1. The most successful of those was the game show "Play It" (שחק אותה). Topaz was a television host in the Israeli public TV Channel 1 in the eighties and early nineties, as well as running some successful sketch comedy shows on stage.

In the nineties he was the host of popular show "Rashut Habidur" (The Entertainment Authority), later renamed "Ha'Rishon Ba'Bidur" (The First at entertainment), that aired for 11 seasons between 1994-2004 on Channel 2 commercial channel, and is one of the highest rated shows ever aired on commercial TV in Israel. After the show ended, Topaz hosted several other shows on other channels, but in May 2007 he announced that he would no longer host TV shows, but would pursue other careers such as acting and documentary film making.

Controversy
In 1981, Topaz gained notoriety from comments he made during an Israeli Labor Party political rally in Tel Aviv's  Malchei Yisrael Square (later renamed Rabin Square) when he said: "It's a pleasure to see the crowd here, and it's a pleasure to see that there are no chahchahim (derogatory slang word alluding to Israeli Jews of Middle Eastern background) who ruin election gatherings. The Likud's chachchahim are at Metzudat Ze'ev." (Likud party headquarters)

Criminal charges and suicide 

In May 2009, Topaz was arrested on suspicion of ordering, organizing and paying for a series of attacks on top-level TV executives Avi Nir and Shira Margalit and showbiz agent Boaz Ben-Zion. The three were beaten by assailants and sustained serious injuries. Topaz was also accused of planning attacks against television figures Zvika Hadar, Erez Tal, and Avri Gilad, Israel Hayom editor-in-chief Amos Regev, his ex-wife Roni Chen, and her husband Haim Zenati, as well as a second assault against Ben-Zion after judging that the first had not been severe enough. Topaz allegedly went on this revenge spree because his show was taken off the air, and because he was rejected by rival channels and newspapers for which he offered to write guest columns. On June 2, 2009, it was reported that Topaz had confessed to having ordered the assaults. Topaz was later also indicted for drug possession, due to allegations that for the previous three years, Topaz had purchased cocaine from Ofir Sasportas, one of the other suspects in the case.

He attempted suicide in his prison cell at the Abu Kabir Detention Center in Tel Aviv on July 3, 2009, after taking an overdose of insulin, used to control his diabetes. He was briefly hospitalized.

A second suicide attempt on August 20, 2009, was successful, and at approximately 7:00 AM Topaz was found by a warden hanging in a shower (the only place without video surveillance) in the Nitzan Detention Center in Ramla. He apparently used the cord of an electric kettle to hang himself. He was buried in the Yarkon Cemetery in a funeral that hundreds of people attended.

In 2012 several men who Topaz hired to carry out the assaults were convicted or reached plea bargains.

References

External links 
 
 Official website 
 360:The Story of Dudu Topaz 

1946 births
2009 suicides
People from Haifa
Israeli television personalities
Israeli entertainers
Israeli male comedians
Israeli people of Ukrainian-Jewish descent
People who committed suicide in prison custody
Suicides by hanging in Israel
Israeli people who died in prison custody
Prisoners who died in Israeli detention
Burials at Yarkon Cemetery
20th-century Israeli comedians